Torkild Henning Andersen (20 July 1916 – 21 May 1977) was a Norwegian footballer. He played in five matches for the Norway national football team from 1937 to 1939. He was also named in Norway's squad for the Group 2 qualification tournament for the 1938 FIFA World Cup.

References

1916 births
1977 deaths
Norwegian footballers
Norway international footballers
Sportspeople from Fredrikstad
Association football forwards
Lisleby FK players
Moss FK players